Edward Ball (born 23 November 1959) is an English songwriter, singer, guitarist and keyboard player from London, who has recorded both solo and as a member of the Television Personalities, 'O' Level, Teenage Filmstars, The Times, and Conspiracy of Noise. He also worked for Creation Records. He was born and brought up in Chelsea, London.

Biography

Television Personalities
In 1977, singer/songwriter Ball and fellow London Oratory school-friend Dan Treacy formed the Television Personalities. Ball also formed 'O' Level with John Bennett, Gerard Bennett, and Dick Scully, releasing two singles in 1978. In 1979, he recorded as the Teenage Filmstars, along with fellow members of the Television Personalities, releasing three singles between 1979 and 1980. Ball and Treacy ('Slaughter' Joe Foster left the band prior to the recording of any material under the Television Personalities name) released And Don't the Kids Just Love It (1980) for Rough Trade Records. Following a brief parting with Rough Trade, they launched their own label Whaam! Records with Mummy Your Not Watching Me (1981), They Could Have Been Bigger Than the Beatles (1982) and And Don't the Kids Just Love It. The Whaam! record label was later renamed Dreamworld, following a legal dispute with George Michael. Ball, meanwhile, had formed a more permanent outlet for his music in 1981 with The Times, releasing the Pop Goes Art! album in 1982, and leaving the TV Personalities the same year, although he later returned in 2004, appearing on the album My Dark Places (Domino Records, 2005) and on parts of the albums And They All Lived Happily Ever After (Damaged Goods, 2004) and Are We Nearly There Yet? (Overground, 2007).

The Times
On leaving the Television Personalities, Ball concentrated on The Times, a band with an ever-changing line-up in which he remained the only constant member. Following Pop Goes Art!, from 1982 to 1986 the band released four further albums, two mini-albums and an EP on Ball's own Artpop label plus another album 'Go! With The Times' on the German label Pastell. In 1986 Ball dissolved The Times to become an executive at Creation Records; however, in 1988 he began to release new material under the Times name, starting with the album Beat Torture. Three albums were also released by Ball under the name of the Teenage Filmstars (although the other members of the original Teenage Filmstars were not involved in any way), Star (1992), Rocket Charms (1993) and Buy Our Record Support Our Sickness (1995).

In 2005, Ball reactivated his Artpop! label through Cherry Red, debuting with Here's To Old England!, a three-decade anthology of his work as The Times, Teenage Filmstars and 'O' Level. This was followed by comprehensive reissues of This Is London (2006) and I Helped Patrick McGoohan Escape (2006). The series continues late May 2007 with O' Level 1977 – 1980 compilation, A Day in the Life of Gilbert & George and The Times' first recorded album, GO! With The Times!.

Solo career
Ball's first solo release was the L'Orange Mechanik album in 1989, featuring music inspired by the poems of Edgar Allan Poe. As a side-project to The Times, Ball released dance music records as the Love Corporation in 1990. Between that year and 1997, he released four albums under this name on Creation. He also collaborated with Richard Green as Sand on the 1991 album The Dynamic Curve, and with Phil Vane of Extreme Noise Terror as Conspiracy of Noise on the 1993 album Chicks with Dicks and Splatter Flicks. In 1995 Creation Records issued a two-disc compilation of Ball's material, Welcome to the Wonderful World of Ed Ball, covering all his material other than that released with the Television Personalities. Two albums of solo material were released to coincide with it, If a Man Ever Loved a Woman (1995) and Catholic Guilt (1997), followed by Why Do I Need A Gun I'm Chelsea (1999). 

For the first time on any of his projects, Ball found a promoter willing to support Catholic Guilt, which yielded two UK Top 75 chart singles, "The Mill Hill Self Hate Club" and "Love Is Blue". Following the collapse of Creation in 1999 Ball was unsigned to any other label and disappeared from public view, to concentrate on experimental film documentaries about Simon Fisher Turner and London. In 2004 Ball rejoined the Television Personalities, but left soon thereafter.

Discography

with Television Personalities

Albums
And Don't the Kids Just Love It (1981), Rough Trade
Mummy Your Not Watching Me (1982), Whaam!
They Could Have Been Bigger Than The Beatles (1982), Whaam!

Singles, EPs
"14th Floor" (1978), W1 Teen
Where's Bill Grundy Now? EP (1978), King's Road
"Smashing Time" (1980), Rough Trade
"I Know Where Syd Barrett Lives" (1981), Rough Trade
"Three Wishes" (1982), Whaam!

with O-Level
see 'O' Level Discography

with Teenage Filmstars
see Teenage Filmstars Discography

with The Times
see The Times Discography

as Love Corporation

Albums
Tones (1990), Creation
Lovers (1991), Creation
Intelligentsia (1994), Creation
Dance Stance (1997), Creation

Singles
"Palatial" (1990), Creation
"Give Me Some Love" (1991), Creation

with Sand
The Dynamic Curve (1991), Creation
Vol. Two – Five Grains (1992), Creation

with Conspiracy of Noise
Chicks with Dicks and Splatter Flicks (1993), Creation

Solo

Studio albums
L'Orange Mechanik (1989), Creation
 If A Man Ever Loved A Woman (1995), Creation
"It's Kinda Lonely Where I Am" (acoustic) / "Firehorse" / "If A Man Ever Loved A Woman" / "She's Just High Maintenance, Baby" / "The Arizona Loner" / "You Only Miss Me When I'm Bleeding" / "The Ballad of a Lonely Man" / "A Ton of Blues" / "You're An Idiot Babe" / "It's Kinda Lonely Where I Am"
 Catholic Guilt (1997), Creation
"The Mill Hill Self Hate Club" / "Love Is Blue" / "Docklands Blues" / "Controversial Girlfriend" / "The Hampstead Therapist" / "Tilt" / "Trailblaze" / "Never Live To Love Again" / "This Is The Story of My Love" / "This Is Real"
 Why Do I Need A Gun I'm Chelsea (May 1999), Creation
"The Other Side of Love Is Guilt" / "For The Souls of Dead Horses" / "Never Live To Love Again" / "Bled A River Over You" / "So Sad But True" / "Docklands Blues" / "Ma Blues" / "Another Member of the Mill Hill Self Hate Club" / "If A Man Ever Loved A Woman" / "12 Noon 28.8.93" / "When You Lose Your Lover Learn To Lose" / "Love Is Blue"* / "I'm Going Out of Your Mind" / "Blues For Brian Wilson" / "Wrapped Up in Lonesome Blues" / "An Act of Faith" / "Mill Hill Self Hate Club"*
* From Mark Radcliffe BBC Radio One Session

Compilations
 Welcome to the Wonderful World of Ed Ball (March 1995), Creation
 Here's to Old England! (October 2005), Creation

Singles & EPs
"If a Man Ever Loved a Woman" (1995), Creation
"If A Man Ever Loved A Woman" / "Firehorse Blues" / "12 Noon 28.8.93" / "United States of Loneliness"

"It's Kinda Lonely Where I Am"
"It's Kinda Lonely Where I Am" / "Docklands Blues" / "Another Member of the Mill Hill Self Hate Club" / "Bled A River Over You"

"The Mill Hill Self Hate Club" (1996), Creation – UK No. 57
"The Mill Hill Self Hate Club" / "Wrapped Up in Lonesome Blues" / "I'm Going Out of Your Mind" / "An Act of Faith"

"Trailblaze" (1996), Creation
"Trailblaze" / "The Other Side of Love Is Guilt" / "Blues For Brian Wilson"

"Love Is Blue" (1997), Creation – UK No. 59
"Love Is Blue" / "When You Lose Your Lover Learn To Lose" / "Mill Hill Self Hate Club"* / "Love Is Blue"*
* Mark Radcliffe session

"The Mill Hill Self Hate Club" (1997), Creation – reissue
"The Mill Hill Self Hate Club" / "For The Souls of Dead Horses" / "Ma Blues" / "Never Live To Love Again"

Split Xmas single (1996), Creation
A: Ed Ball – "Never Live to Love Again" / AA: 18 Wheeler – "Ballad of Paul Verlaine"

References

External links
televisionpersonalities.co.uk: Edward Ball

1959 births
Living people
English male singer-songwriters
Creation Records artists
British post-punk musicians
Alumni of Oratorian schools